Blesovce is a village and municipality in the Topoľčany District of the Nitra Region, Slovakia. In 2011, the village had 334 inhabitants.

See also
 List of municipalities and towns in Slovakia

References

External links
Official homepage
Surnames of living people in Blesovce

Villages and municipalities in Topoľčany District